McCarthy Island may refer to:
 McCarthy Island (Kemp Land)
 McCarthy Island (South Georgia)

See also
 MacCarthy Island